Satyricon is an ancient Roman novel attributed to Petronius Arbiter.

Satyricon may also refer to:

 Fellini Satyricon, a 1969 film by Federico Fellini based on Petronius' book
 Satyricon (1969 Polidoro film), a 1969 film by Gian Luigi Polidoro based on Petronius' book
 Satyricon (band), a Norwegian black metal band
 Satyricon (Satyricon album), 2013 self-titled album by the band
 Satyricon (nightclub), a defunct Portland, Oregon, nightclub germinal to the Pacific Northwest punk movement
 Satyricon (Meat Beat Manifesto album) by Meat Beat Manifesto
 Satyricon (opera), an opera by Bruno Maderna
 Satyricon (theatre), a theatre in Moscow

See also
Satirikon, a Russian weekly magazine of satire and humor published 1908–1918